Herbert Johnson (Oct 30, 1878–Oct 13, 1946) was an American cartoonist. He drew political cartoons in the 1930s and also cartoon covers for magazines including Saturday Evening Post and Country Gentleman.

References

External links
 Cartoons by Herbert Johnson at the Library of Congress

1878 births
1946 deaths
American cartoonists
People from Clay County, Nebraska